Sebastian Dehmer (born February 14, 1982, in Darmstadt, Hessen) is a male athlete from Germany, who competes in triathlon. Dehmer competed at the second Olympic triathlon at the 2004 Summer Olympics.  He placed twenty-sixth with a total time of 1:57:39.28.

References
sports-reference

1982 births
Living people
German male triathletes
Triathletes at the 2004 Summer Olympics
Sportspeople from Darmstadt
Olympic triathletes of Germany
21st-century German people